Sailaab (English: Flood) is a Bollywood suspense thriller film of 1990 directed by Deepak Balraj Vij, starring Aditya Pancholi and Madhuri Dixit in lead roles. This film is a remake of 1988 Tamil film Kan Simittum Neram.

Saroj Khan won the Filmfare Best Choreography Award for Madhuri's dance for the song "Humko Aaj Kal Hai Intezaar". The song also features in "Top 10 songs of Madhuri Dixit" published by Times of India.

Plot
Dr. Sushma Malhotra (Madhuri Dixit) treats her patient; a kind thief and killer (Aditya Pancholi), who has lost his memory in an accident. She renames him Krishna. For the care she takes, Krishna falls in love with her and then they get married. But after they are married, Inspector Ranjeet Kapoor (Suresh Oberoi) warns her that her husband was set to kill her before his accident and may again attempt to kill her, but she disregards this. In another accident while taking photographs of Sushma, Krishna falls down and hurts his head. This injury brings back his old memories about his beloved sister's suicide at her failed marriage because Sushma attached a false photo of them and wrote a false letter she was pregnant with his child which results in him trying to kill her. He says his name is Rajeev and claims Sushma killed his sister, but Inspector Ranjeet arrives in time to stop him and tell him a criminal named Monty actually killed his sister. Together, Inspector Ranjeet and Rajeev find Monty and his gang and Monty confesses to killing Rajeev's sister because he wanted to blackmail him. Rajeev kills him while Inspector Ranjeet kills his gang. An injured Rajeev regrets harming his wife and they are united, saying that he is not Rajeev, he is her "Krishna".

Cast
 Aditya Pancholi as Rajeev / Krishna
 Madhuri Dixit as Dr. Sushma Malhotra
 Kulbhushan Kharbanda as Dr. Din
 Suresh Oberoi as Inspector Ranjeet Kapoor
 Shafi Inamdar as Inspector Haidar Ali
 Om Shivpuri as Mr. Mathur
 Leena Kamat
 Kishore Namit

Awards
 Filmfare Award: Best Choreography to Saroj Khan for the song "Humko Aaj Kal Hai Intezaar".

Soundtrack
The songs are composed by Bappi Lahiri and lyrics were penned by Javed Akhtar. Aadesh Shrivastava did background music for the film.

References

External links
 

1990 films
1990s Hindi-language films
Films scored by Bappi Lahiri
Hindi remakes of Tamil films
Films directed by Deepak Balraj Vij
Indian crime drama films